Sabrina Saqeb is an Afghan politician who served as a member of parliament from 2005 to 2010. She received media attention in 2009 when she participated in and helped organize protests against a law passed by Afghan president Hamid Karzai pertaining to Shiite personal law. Among other things, the law required women to have sex with their husbands at a certain frequency, and required women to get permission before leaving their house. After completing her tenure in parliament, Saqeb co-founded an organization called the "Research Institute for Women, Peace and Security," and became an advocate for Women's rights.

References

Afghan women's rights activists
Members of the National Assembly (Afghanistan)
21st-century Afghan women politicians
21st-century Afghan politicians